Turbonilla gloriamishimana is a species of sea snail, a marine gastropod mollusk in the family Pyramidellidae, the pyrams and their allies.

Description
The length of the shell varies between 15 mm and 20 mm.

Distribution
This species occurs in the Pacific Ocean off the Philippines and Japan.

References

External links
 To Encyclopedia of Life
 To World Register of Marine Species
 

gloriamishimana
Gastropods described in 1999